Contemporary Clinical Trials is a monthly peer-reviewed medical journal covering clinical trials and research design in clinical medicine. It was established in 2005 and is published by Elsevier. The editor-in-chief is JoAnn E. Manson, MD, MPH, DrPH (Harvard Medical School). it was established in 1980 as Controlled Clinical Trials and obtained its current title in 2005.

According to the Journal Citation Reports, the journal has a 2020 impact factor of 2.226.

References

External links 
 

General medical journals
Elsevier academic journals
English-language journals
Bimonthly journals
Publications established in 1980